Senemoğlu is a village in Göle District of Ardahan Province, Turkey. Its population is 996 (2021). The village is named after Senem who was born during the escape of her family soon after the Russians occupied the area around the settlement in the Russo-Turkish War (1877–1878). But the area was returned to Turkey after the First World War.

References

Villages in Göle District